Crime and Punishment is a 1935 American drama film directed by Josef von Sternberg for Columbia Pictures. The screenplay was adapted by Joseph Anthony and S.K. Lauren from Fyodor Dostoevsky's 1866 novel of the same title. The film stars Peter Lorre in the lead role of Raskolnikov (here named Roderick instead of Rodion).

Von Sternberg, who was contractually obliged to make the film, disliked it, later writing that it was "no more related to the true text of the novel than the corner of Sunset Boulevard and Gower is related to the Russian environment."

The Library of Congress holds a print.

Synopsis

The American Film Institute provides a summary of the film's narrative:

Cast 
 Peter Lorre - Roderick Raskolnikov
 Edward Arnold - Inspector Porfiry
 Marian Marsh - Sonya
 Tala Birell - Antonya Raskolnikov
 Elizabeth Risdon - Mrs. Raskolnikov (as Elisabeth Risdon)
 Robert Allen - Dmitri
 Douglas Dumbrille - Grilov
 Gene Lockhart - Lushin
 Charles Waldron - University President
 Thurston Hall - Editor
 Johnny Arthur - Clerk
 Mrs. Patrick Campbell - Pawnbroker

Production

Sternberg and Paramount studios ended their eight-year affiliation with the completion of The Devil is a Woman, the director's seventh and final collaboration with actress Marlene Dietrich.

Producer B. P. Schulberg, recently expelled from Paramount, joined Harry Cohn's Columbia Pictures and quickly brought Sternberg on board in a two-picture contract with the "poorly financed" studio.

Dostoyevsky's psychological exploration of a murderer, his remorse and redemption posed an immense challenge for cinematic rendering "as there could be no visual equivalent [for] the author's detailed reasoning and elaborate description of [his characters] mental attitudes." Harry Cohn approved the project in part because Crime and Punishment, first published in 1866, was in the public domain and would require no copyright fees. Crime and Punishment exemplifies a trend in Hollywood of the 1930s towards elevating feature film credentials through adapting classical literature "to lend an air of prestige" to the film industry.

The "odd cast", bestowed upon Sternberg, included a mix of Columbia contract artists as well as "supers"—freelance players engaged without a contract, for a modest fee—that satisfied Columbia's budgetary constraints.

Production code officials had reviewed a recent stage adaption of the novel and warned that the narrative describes "a failure of the police to arrest and prosecute the young college student [Raskolnikov]" and that "serious thematic difficulties will be encountered because of the characterization of the heroine [Sonya] as a prostitute. This characterization is a definite part of the plot."

Sternberg, recognizing the complexities inherent to the novel, prudently chose to compose a straightforward genre film "about a detective and a criminal."

Critical reception
Writing for The Spectator in 1936, Graham Greene gave the film a poor review, noting that despite the fine acting of Peter Lorre, this version of Crime and Punishment was entirely too vulgar. Greene commented that the original Russian story of "religious and unhappy mind" had been altered in this picture into a "lunch-bar-chromium version" with idealism, ethics, and optimism "of a salesman who has never failed to sell his canned beans". He recommended Crime et Châtiment as a much better version of the story.

References

Sources
American Film Institute. 2017. Crime and Punishment (1935). Movie details, History section. Retrieved 2 July 2018. https://catalog.afi.com/Catalog/MovieDetails/4127
Beltzer, Thomas. 2004. Crime and Punishment: A Neglected Classic. Senses of Cinema. Retrieved 2 July 2018. http://sensesofcinema.com/2004/cteq/crime_and_punishment/
Baxter, John. 1971. The Cinema of Josef von Sternberg. The International Film Guide Series. A.S Barners & Company, New York.
Beltzer, Thomas. 2004. Crime and Punishment: A Neglected Classic. Senses of Cinema. Retrieved 2 July 2018. http://sensesofcinema.com/2004/cteq/crime_and_punishment/
Sarris, Andrew. 1966. The Films of Josef von Sternberg. Museum of Modern Art/Doubleday. New York, New York.
Supten, Tom. 2006. Auteur in Distress: On Wallace Beery, von Sternberg, and Sergeant Madden. Bright Lights Film Journal. Retrieved 12 July 2018. http://brightlightsfilm.com/auteur-distress-wallace-beery-von-sternberg-sergeant-madden/#.W0ea_ZCWyUk
Swanbeck, Laura. 2013.  The Crank: 'Crime and Punishment' Program Notes. UCLA Film and Television Archive. Retrieved 2 July 2018. http://www.tft.ucla.edu/mediascape/blog/the-crank-crime-and-punishment-program-notes-41113-screening/

External links 
 
 
 
 

1935 films
Films directed by Josef von Sternberg
1935 drama films
Films based on Crime and Punishment
American drama films
Films produced by B. P. Schulberg
American black-and-white films
Films scored by Louis Silvers
Columbia Pictures films
1930s English-language films
1930s American films